Sir Albion Henry Herbert Richardson   (2 October 1874 – 7 July 1950) was a British barrister and Liberal Party politician.

The son of James Henry Richardson of Hendon, he was privately educated in France and Germany.

He worked as a lawyer, and became a partner in a London legal firm. In 1912 he was called to the bar at Gray's Inn. In the meantime he had entered politics, having been elected to the Commons as Member of Parliament for Peckham at the general election of December 1910, unseating the sitting Conservative MP.

During the First World War Richardson was appointed to a number of committees: he was chairman of the Appeal Tribunal for the County of London, and served on the Committee on the Employment of Aliens in Government Offices with Lord Justice Sir John Eldon Bankes and James Craig.

At the 1918 general election he was re-elected as Peckham's MP as a Coalition Liberal. In 1919 he was appointed by the Home Secretary to examine allegations of abuse of conscientious objectors by the Governor of Wandsworth Prison. He was subsequently appointed on a number of occasions to enquire into and report upon allegations against the police. In 1918 he was awarded the CBE and in 1919 was knighted. He stood down from parliament at the 1922 general election.

Richardson returned to his legal career, working mainly in the area of commercial law. In 1930 he "took silk" and became King's Counsel and was made a bencher of Gray's Inn. In 1931 was appointed Recorder of Warwick. In 1936 he became Recorder of Nottingham, an office he held until his death. He was elected Treasurer of Gray's Inn for 1944.

He died at his London home in July 1950 aged 75, and was cremated at Golders Green Crematorium.

References

External links

1874 births
1950 deaths
Liberal Party (UK) MPs for English constituencies
UK MPs 1910–1918
Members of Gray's Inn
British King's Counsel
People from Hendon
Lawyers from London